Clément Sami Nicolas Benhaddouche (born 11 May 1996) is a French professional footballer who plays for Hong Kong Premier League club Kitchee.

College career
Benhaddouche spent his college career in the United States, playing for UMass Minutemen in NCAA Division I. During his season season in 2018, he made 11 appearances with five starts in 462 minutes of action. He had two assists and attempted six shots in a 3-1 win at George Washington (10/31) to help clinch an A-10 Tournament appearance for the Minutemen. Benhaddouche also found the back of the net for his first career goal in a 1-1 draw at VCU (11/4) in the A-10 Tournament.

Club career
On 16 January 2019, Kitchee announced the joining of Benhaddouche after his graduation from college. He scored his first goal for Kitchee in the HKPL match against Pegasus on 23 February 2019.

Personal life
Benhaddouche moved to Hong Kong soon after he was born. He was raised in Hong Kong and is a graduate of Canadian International School of Hong Kong.

Career statistics

Club

Notes

Honours

Club
Kitchee
 Hong Kong Premier League: 2019–20
 Hong Kong Senior Shield: 2018–19
 Hong Kong FA Cup: 2018–19
 Hong Kong Sapling Cup: 2019–20

References

1996 births
Living people
French footballers
French expatriate footballers
Association football midfielders
Hong Kong Premier League players
Kitchee SC players
Expatriate footballers in Hong Kong
Expatriate soccer players in the United States
French expatriate sportspeople in Hong Kong
French expatriate sportspeople in the United States
UMass Minutemen soccer players